Preben Isaksson (22 January 1943 – 27 December 2008) was a Danish cyclist. He won a bronze medal in the 4000 m individual pursuit at the 1964 Summer Olympics, and placed fifth with a team.

In 1961 Isaksson won the national pursuit title and reached the quarter-finals at the world championships. He won two team medals at the world championships in 1962–63 and an individual bronze medal in 1965; in 1964 he crashed during a qualification round. He retired in 1967 with a tally of seven national pursuit titles.

References

1943 births
2008 deaths
Danish male cyclists
Olympic cyclists of Denmark
Olympic bronze medalists for Denmark
Cyclists at the 1964 Summer Olympics
Olympic medalists in cycling
Cyclists from Copenhagen
Medalists at the 1964 Summer Olympics